Pisang Ambon is a brand of Dutch liqueur produced, distributed and marketed by the House of Lucas Bols. It has a dominating banana flavour, with additional tropical fruit nuances, and a bright green colour. It is based on the recipe of an old Indonesian liqueur. A purple version has been released, called Pisang Ambon Guaraná Lime.

Etymology 
"Pisang" is Indonesian/Malay for banana. Ambon is the capital city of an Indonesian province that was once a Dutch colony. "Pisang Ambon" is the Indonesian name for the Gros Michel cultivar. Although the name of the banana is not referring to Ambon as the source but from Javanese word for smell.

See also 
Banana beer
Banana wine
East African Highland bananas
List of liqueurs

References

External links 
 Official site

Fruit liqueurs
Bananas